Jeffrey James Schwarz (born March 28, 1996) is an American professional baseball catcher in the Oakland Athletics organization. He played college baseball for the Florida Gators.

Career
Schwarz attended Palm Beach Gardens Community High School in Palm Beach Gardens, Florida. As a senior, he hit .337 with seven home runs and 35 runs batted in (RBI). He was drafted by the Milwaukee Brewers in the 17th round of the 2014 MLB draft. He did not sign with the Brewers and attended the University of Florida where he played college baseball for the Florida Gators.

Schwarz started all 70 games his freshman year at Florida in 2015. In 256 at-bats he hit .332 and led the team in RBIs (73), home runs (18), doubles (16), sacrifice flies (6), and slugging percentage (.629). Against Stetson University, he hit a school-record four home runs. He helped lead Florida to the College World Series, where they were eliminated by Virginia. He was named the Freshman Player of the Year by the Collegiate Baseball Newspaper and the Freshman Hitter of the Year by the National Collegiate Baseball Writers Association (NCBWA).

In 2016, as a sophomore, Schwarz batted .290 with seven home runs and 60 RBIs. In 2016, he played collegiate summer baseball for the Yarmouth-Dennis Red Sox of the Cape Cod Baseball League. As a junior in 2017, he batted .259 with 12 home runs and 54 RBIs. He was drafted in the 38th round of the 2017 MLB draft, but he did not sign and returned to Florida. In 2018, his senior year, he was named to the All-SEC First Team.

Schwarz was drafted by the Oakland Athletics in the eighth round of the 2018 MLB draft. He signed with Oakland on July 6 and made his professional debut with the Arizona League Athletics before being promoted to the Vermont Lake Monsters. In 25 games between the two teams, Schwarz hit .266 with ten RBIs. He began 2019 with the Stockton Ports, and also spent time with the Beloit Snappers. Playing only 44 games between both clubs due to injury, he batted .148/.239/.225 in 142 at bats with three home runs and 14 RBIs.

In 2021 playing for Midland he batted .240/.336/.362 in 254 at bats. Playing in 2022 for Midland and AAA Las Vegas he batted .294/.383/.453	in 276 at bats.

Personal
Schwarz's father, Jeff Schwarz, played in Major League Baseball, and his sister, Taylor Schwarz, played softball at Florida.

References

External links

Florida Gators bio

1996 births
Living people
People from Palm Beach Gardens, Florida
Baseball players from Florida
Baseball catchers
Florida Gators baseball players
Yarmouth–Dennis Red Sox players
Arizona League Athletics players
Vermont Lake Monsters players
Beloit Snappers players
Stockton Ports players